Nadia Kelly Olla (born 7 February 2000) is a New Zealand association football goalkeeper, playing for Western Springs AFC. She has represented New Zealand.

In April 2019, Olla was named to the final 23-player squad for the 2019 FIFA Women's World Cup.

References

External links

Profile at AFF.org.nz

2000 births
Living people
Association footballers from Auckland
2019 FIFA Women's World Cup players
Women's association football goalkeepers
New Zealand women's association footballers